Anthracus haemorrhous is an insect-eating ground beetle of the Anthracus genus. It is found in Indonesia.

References

haemorrhous